Qeshlaq-e Owch Bolaq (also Romanized as Qeshlāq-e Owch Bolāq) is a village in Qeshlaq-e Jonubi Rural District, Qeshlaq Dasht District, Bileh Savar County, Ardabil Province, Iran. At the 2006 census, its population was 94, in 25 families.

References 

Towns and villages in Bileh Savar County